Our Lady's Hospital was a psychiatric hospital in Ennis, County Clare, Ireland.

History
The hospital, which was designed by William Fogerty, opened as the Ennis Asylum in 1868. It became Ennis Mental Hospital in the 1920s and went on to become Our Lady's Hospital in the 1950s. After the introduction of deinstitutionalisation in the late 1980s the hospital went into a period of decline and closed in March 2002. The site, which has changed hands several times since the hospital closed, was acquired by a new developer in March 2018.

References

Hospitals in County Clare
Psychiatric hospitals in the Republic of Ireland
Hospital buildings completed in 1868
1868 establishments in Ireland
Hospitals established in 1868
Defunct hospitals in the Republic of Ireland
2002 disestablishments in Ireland
Hospitals disestablished in 2002